Princess Maria di Grazia (Full Italian name: Maria delle Grazie Pia Chiara Anna Teresa Isabella Luitgarda Apollonia Agata Cecilia Filomena Antonia Lucia Cristina Caterina di Borbone ) (12 August 1878 – 20 June 1973) was a princess of Bourbon-Two Sicilies and princess of Orléans-Braganza through her marriage to Prince Luiz of Orléans-Braganza.

Family
Maria was the daughter of Prince Alfonso of Bourbon-Two Sicilies, Count of Caserta and his wife Princess Antonietta of Bourbon-Two Sicilies. She was usually called “Maria Pia”. Her father, the third son of King Ferdinand II of the Two Sicilies, became Head of the Royal House of the Two Sicilies with the death of his elder brother, King Francis II, in 1894. At the time of his birth, however, the Sicilian Royal Family was already exiled in France due to Italian Unification, which took place in 1861.

Marriage and issue
Maria married Prince Luiz Maria of Orléans-Braganza, son of Prince Gaston of Orléans, Count of Eu and his wife Isabel, Princess Imperial of Brazil, on 4 November 1908 in Cannes, France. Maria and Luiz had three children:

Prince Pedro Henrique Afonso Felipe Maria Miguel Gabriel Rafael Gonzaga of Orléans-Braganza (13 September 1909 – 5 July 1981)
 ∞ Princess Maria Elisabeth of Bavaria (1914–2011) at Nymphenburg Palace on 19 August 1937. Pedro Henrique and Maria had twelve children.

Prince Luiz Gastão Antônio Maria Filipe Miguel Gabriel Rafael Gonzaga of Orléans-Braganza (19 February 1911 – 8 September 1931)
Princess Pia Maria Raniera Isabella Antonia Vitoria Thereza Amélia Gerarda Raimunda Anna Micaela Rafaela Gabriela Gonzaga of Orléans-Braganza (4 March 1913 – 24 October 2000)
 ∞ René, Count de Nicolay at Paris on 12 August 1933. Pia Maria and René had three sons.

Later life
Prince Luís died in 1920 leaving Maria a widow for the remainder of her life. In 1922, Maria accompanied the Brazilian Imperial Family to Brazil for the country's centennial celebrations of its independence. During the course of the trip, the Count of Eu died while recumbent upon her shoulder. Princess Maria preferred to live with her children in France, where they could have a better education.
She died at her country house in Mandelieu and was later buried at the Orléans Mausoleum at Dreux, with her husband. She was short of her ninety-fifth birthday.

Ancestry

References

External links

1878 births
1973 deaths
People from Cannes
House of Orléans-Braganza
Princesses of Bourbon-Two Sicilies
French Roman Catholics
Burials at the Chapelle royale de Dreux